Boybuloq (also known as Boy-Bulok and Boj-Bulok) is a limestone cave in Uzbekistan, the deepest cave in Central Asia and all Asia except its western part. It is situated at the edge of Baysun-Tau mountain ridge, the southern spur of the Gissar Range, in the southeast of the country. The nearest village is Dehibolo (Дюйбало in Russian), to the northeast of Boysun.

The cave developed in the covered karst of Upper and Middle Jurassic limestones, in monoclinal strata, in the preserved wing of an anticline. The thickness of limestone strata is from 200 to 350 meters. Contrary to most limestone caves it was not formed by water precipitation penetrating from the surface but, as the soluble rock is covered by insoluble strata, by condensation.

It was explored by Russian cavers since 1984, in the framework of Ekaterinburg Speleo Club (SGS) and the Assoсiation of Ural speleologists (ASU), with the participation of cavers from Italy, Great Britain, Slovakia, France and Switzerland (in chronological order).

Naming 
After the rain a small stream, a rarity in otherwise very arid mountain, flows from the cave entrance and it gave the cave a name. It is a composition of two words: boy buloq, which translates to rich spring in Uzbek language and the language of the people from the nearest village, the Tajiki.

Early History 

The cave was known to local people since ancient times, because from its entrance a stream of water flows down the slope of the otherwise very arid mountain landscape. In April 1971 Mustafo Zokirovič Holmominov (born 1917), a farmer from Dehibolo departed on a 4-hour trek to the cave (6 km) with his son Hudojberdy (born 1957) on two donkeys. The cave was known to him, he visited it several times before. The two reached the cave and Mustafo went into the cave to pray. After a crawl of about one hour, he reached the point close to the first shaft, where his kerosene lamp went out. In the darkness he missed the direction towards the entrance, and fell to his death into the abyss. Hudojberdy waited at the entrance for two days when the villagers from Dehibolo came and returned him home by force.

Young men from Dehibolo tried to find Mustafo in the cave on several occasions that summer and in the following years but to no avail. His remains were only discovered in 1985, during the first speleological exploration of the cave.

Exploration 

After the discovery of Kiev Cave on the Kirk Tau plateau in Uzbekistan in 1972, 2340 m a. s. l., which was in the subsequent years explored to the depth of 990 m and was in the years 1977-1978 the deepest cave in the USSR, Russian speleologists from Ekaterinburg (SGS) in the late 1970s and early 1980s started to search for new deep caves in the wider area of the country. In May 1981 they discovered the Zindan cave (later renamed to Urals-Zenkov (Zindan) cave), 3100 m a. s. l., in the Ketmen'-Čapta ridge. Its spring at the elevation of 1300 m indicated the possibility of a very deep cave. Until January 1983 the final depth of 565 m was reached, in the siphon too narrow to dive. Several search expeditions in the summer 1983 were fruitless, while in 1984 a token SGS expedition to Khodja-Gur-Gur-Ata massif discovered a number of promising entrances.

During a larger expedition in 1985 a group of five expedition members was sent to Surkhan-Tau ridge to scout its surface for new caves. On the way, in the village Kurgancha, 1455 m a. s. l., they were told of a cave higher in the mountain, called Boybuloq into which a villager from the highest settlement in Uzbekistan, the village Dehibolo, went in 1971 and never returned. They followed the stream bed and discovered the low cave entrance, at an elevation of 2650 m. The cave began with 30 meters of a crawl, up to the throat in liquid mud, after which it was possible to stand up. A narrow meander followed, it slowly ascended for 600 meters in straight direction, to a height of 90 meters, where it turned down. Soon a 27 meter pit was reached and they discovered human bones at its bottom. They belonged to Mustafo Zokirovič Holmominov.

Not only Boybuloq cave but most other caves in the area are a long sequence of tight passages which are difficult to pass, and where possibilities for help or rescue operation are very limited, as described by Sergej Kuklev, a member of the SGS team:

In the following years further expeditions took place: in 1986 the cave was deepened to -400 m, in 1987 to -500 m and the remains of Zokirov were returned to his family, in 1988 a siphon at -600 m was free-dived and also the barrier on the other side lowered so that the lake could be waded through, and a new branch of the cave was discovered - it continued to -900 m. In 1989 a combined Soviet-Italian team reached the terminal siphon at -1158 m, and managed to climb upwards to the point at an elevation of +156 m which gave the total cave depth of 1310 m. In 1990 a Soviet-British team managed to extend the New branch in the cave upwards to +222 m (total depth 1376 m). As can be seen from the above map this international participation in discoveries was reflected in the naming of three substantial cave sections: the Italian, English and Russian tunnels.

In 1991 lower levels of the New branch were discovered, and in 1992 an additional chimney upwards was climbed, to +257 m which gave the final cave depth of 1415 m. In 1995 a major collapse in the cave was dug through, in 1998 the diving of the siphon at -560 m was unsuccessful, and the spring Holtan-Čašma, where the water from the terminal cave siphon comes to light, was also dived. The spring is situated 130 m below the terminal cave siphon while the horizontal distance is 7 km, and so the connecting passages are most likely submerged. In the next years the turmoil which followed the dissolution of the Soviet Union was unfavorable for caving expeditions and SGS cavers returned to Uzbekistan only in 2007, to Boybuloq, and expeditions followed almost every year. New passages in Boybuloq were discovered and explored, yet the cave depth remained the same. Diving in the Holtan-Čašma spring was resumed in 2014, 2015 and 2016, when, at a horizontal distance of 170 m and depth of 18 m, a lenticular grotto was reached with narrow, downwards extending slots, too narrow to pass.

During the 2021 SGS and ASU expedition a survey team mapped the upwards extending tunnels in the New branch of the cave, explored in 2016. Survey data showed that the highest point achieved, where the tunnel narrows into an as yet impassable hole with very strong air current, is situated 272 m above the cave entrance. Boybuloq amplitude changed from 1415 m, achieved in 1992, to 1430 m and cave length increased to 15212 m.

Višnevskij Cave 

2015 In the year of the death of Aleksandr Sergeevič Višnevskij, leader of SGS expeditions to Boybuloq from 1988 - 1992 and from 1995 - 2008, a SGS and ASU search team of 7, led by Vasilij Samsonov from Orenburg, methodically examined the 3 km long section of the 150–200 m high wall which forms the edge of the ridge above Boybuloq. They found several possible cave entrances, all located 30–50 m below the crest of the wall. The most promising proved to be the one marked as ČB-15 (Chul-Bair 15), with the coordinates . The entrance is an 8 m high grotto at an elevation of 3522 m, 25 m below the top of the ridge, access requires a rope descent. It continued with a series of small shafts, connected by narrow meanders. 400 meters far and 70 meters deep the team stopped at a very narrow passage with strong draught. After 4 hours of work they broke the way through and it continued with a bigger shaft, which they left for the next year.

2016 A team of 7, 4 Russians and 3 Italians (La Venta speleo club), from the Baysun-Tau 2016 expedition, worked in the cave. Due to long access route from the base camp (3 hours) part of the camp was moved to the top of the ridge. Situation there was complicated by the lack of water, strong wind and low temperature at night. The team widened the last narrow passage from 2015, descended 15 m into the hall "Martens" which continued with a very narrow but tall meander (3–30 m), followed by an inclined and very slippery meander. It ended with a 40 m shaft, 4–5 hours crawl from the entrance, at the bottom of which a Camp -168 was later erected. They followed the draught, and after a series of narrow passages, vertical and horizontal, which required widening, descended into a slightly wider meander with a small stream at the bottom. After 300 m a 12 m shaft was reached, after which the next meander led, as a tributary, to a wider and higher meander with a larger stream. It ended with a narrow passage which they broke through and reached another 8 m shaft, where the lack of time forced them to return. The surveyed part of the cave was deepened to 234 m and prolonged to 1089 m, with more left unsurveyed. The map showed that the cave, now renamed to Višnevskij cave, steadily descended in the direction of Boybuloq.

2017 A team of 10, from SGS and ASU, set camp above the cave, 3500 m above sea level. After a brief acclimatization they set up the tent underground Camp -168 from where Sergej Terehin and Artur Abdjušev pushed their way through the cave till the siphon at -735 m, in a day-and-night non-stop sortie. Another camp, of hammocks, was set up, the new part is a corridor, on average 50 cm wide, with a stream, into which 4 tributaries (unexplored) flow. The survey reached 586 m in depth and 2800 m in length, it showed that the cave descends steadily towards the New branch of Boybuloq, at an angle of 19 degrees, the same as the surface, at a distance from the surface of  70 – 100 m. Precise survey of the ridge surface was also made, for the construction of the 3D cave model. Part of the team scouted for additional cave entrances on the ridge plateau and along the wall, which would shorten the tiresome and time consuming crawl to the cave bottom. Several interesting caves were found, such as Lunnaja (Moon cave), U istočnika (At the Source), Logovo, they also worked in ČB-17, but none connected to Višnevskij cave.

2018 An international team of 25, 14 from SGS and ASU, 8 from France and 3 from Switzerland set off to explore not only Višnevskij cave, but also caves Boybuloq, Lunnaja and ČB-5. They camped at an altitude of 3000 m, one hour from the entrance to Višnevskij and 1,5 hours from Boybuloq. In the cave two hammock camps were set up, at -350 m and at -600 m. Close to the lower camp, in a side tributary which continued in the opposite (ascending) direction, a small gallery was discovered, a hint of a possible continuation towards Boybuloq. In one of the other two tributaries examined, a large, 90 m tall chimney "Lucas Baldo" was found, which gets close (20 m) to the surface. Outside, in the canyon which leads to Boybuloq, dinosaur footprints were discovered, while in the new branch of this cave more precise survey was made for better location of the connecting point with Višnevskij cave. Siphon bypass was not found, but 2500 m of new tunnels were mapped in Višnevskij and Lunnaja caves.

2019 It was difficult to assemble the expedition as there was no clear continuation, especially not around the siphon but, when cavers from Moscow and Irkutsk also joined the SGS and ASU team, a group of 15 gathered. The surface camp was set up in a proven location near Lunnaja cave, and a team of four: Evgenij Sakulin, Petr Kovešnikov, Anastasija Janina and Andrej Minogin departed to the bottom, to set a Camp Siphon there and to try to find a continuation in the ascending tributary at -600 m. Yet on the very first day at the bottom Evgenij and Anastasija managed to crawl through a narrow, half flooded passage and reached a meander behind the siphon. The cave continued in the right direction. Other plans were scrapped and the team, reinforced with Evgenij Rybka, Vasilij Samsonov and Vadim Loginov (there was a phone connection from the camp to the surface), set off to the new part. It was a wide meander with a stream at the bottom and 1–5 m deep drops. After a while the stream disappeared below the dripstone floor in a narrow passage, above which the "Big gallery" began. It was dry, the ceiling gradually lowered, the tunnel turned to a crawl, solid floor was replaced by clay, it got wet. This part took 2 hours to cross. The passage was cut by a new meander where, below the ceiling, the "Big Collapse Hall" opened up. The following meander was not wide, with a small stream at the bottom, in places covered with dripstone. Another tributary joined from the left.

The passage continued with a few small drops which needed rigging. The beautiful colored meander was named "Amber River" because of the many dripstone formations. From the right came a larger inflow, most likely the main stream which disappeared in the floor before the "Big Gallery". The junction was named "Aquapark", crossing it required a run under a shower. On the left, under the ceiling of the meander, on a small shelf, the Camp "Gnezdo" (Nest) was set up. An even larger meander followed, with a stream of about 1 liter/second. It could seem very small, but for this arid mountain it is a lot. Soon a 12-meter drop, "Freerope" came, with a good shower, followed by 10, 8 and 12 m pits which also required rigging. The party stopped on top of another 20 m shaft, named "50 m rope", after which one more pit was visible. There were no more time, no more rope, no more anchors. The cave ran steadily in the direction of a cascade of pits in the New Branch of Boybuloq. Višnevskij cave was deepened to 1131 m and prolonged to 8004 m. In 2019 three underground camps were installed, at -168 m, -614 m and -1049 m, 2628 m of new tunnels were surveyed, 438 m of new depth.

The deepest point reached in Višnevskij was 50 m vertically (above) and 200 m horizontally apart from Boybuloq.

2020 Due to the COVID-19 pandemic, the plans for a large expedition to caves of Chul-Bair mountain ridge, especially to the Višnevskij cave, were put on hold.

2021 A window of opportunity opened up in June 2021 and an 18-member Russian-French-Slovenian-Uzbek expedition Boybuloq 2021 took place in August of that year. It was also organized in the framework of SGS and ASU, led by Vadim Loginov. The Višnevskij cave continued, after the terminal point reached in 2019, with a series of small pits, followed by a 30 m shaft. At its bottom there were several continuations. The cavers followed the water, and they reached a half-siphon, with little space from the water to the ceiling, followed by two more such half-siphons. The cave continued with a tunnel, with a drop of 20 m, where the water stream, about 10 L/sec., flowed into a large siphon. It would require diving, a dry bypass could not be found. After examining other options, the expedition managed to decrease the intercave distance to 70 m, between the two meanders in both caves, at approximately the same altitude above sea level, both still too narrow to pass.

Cave and the World 
Discoveries in the Višnevskij cave, achieved during the 2019 and 2021 expeditions, confirmed the assumption about the existence of a very deep, complex and wide-spread high-mountain cave system on the Chul-Bair ridge.

In the world there are 14 mountains higher than 8,000 meters - the first was scaled in 1950 and the last in 1964 but only 2 caves are deeper than 2,000 meters. Both so-called supercaves, the last terrestrial frontiers, achieved that status half a century later, Krubera-Voronja (2,197 m deep) surpassed 2,000 m in 2004, after 44 years of exploration, Verëvkina (2,212 m deep) in 2017, 49 years after the discovery. The anticipated connection of Boybuloq and Višnevskij cave would make the third such cave. In 2001 the location of the deepest cave in the world moved from Central Europe to Abkhazia in the Western Caucasus where, as of 2020, the four deepest caves were to be found. The possibility for achieving greater depths is however limited as the cave entrance elevations in the relevant limestone areas, the Arabika and Bzyb massifs, rarely surpass 2300 m (top peaks are Mt. Arabika, 2656 m and Mt. Napra, 2684 m). The other two limestone areas with known great deep cave potential, are the Sierra Juárez, Oaxaca in southern Mexico with Chevé Cave where the limestone layer is over 2,500 m thick, and Aladaglar massif in Turkey with Kuzgun cave, with limestone layer thickness of 4,000 m. Yet despite very substantial efforts, over 40 years of work in Sierra Juárez and over 20 years in Aladaglar, no depth past the 1524 m and 1400 m, respectively, could be reached.

All these facts considerably increased the attention, paid to Boybuloq, to Uzbekistan, and to central Asia, in the speleo world. Several regional projects were initiated, such as Research of karst and the caves of mountain Baysun-Tau, 2020-2021, Karst on the Roof of the World (Pamir, Tajikistan), 2020-2021, Central Asian transboundary speleoproject, Speleological expedition “Tuya-Muyun - 2021 (Foothills of the Alai ridge, Kyrgyzstan). Boybuloq and Chul-Bair were also added to the list of Uzbekistan tourist attractions.

The cave was covered in the book of the visit by Italian cavers in 1989, it featured in a report by BBC, there are several pages devoted to it in the book by SGS, the team who developed the cave, and it is the main subject in a novel by one of the team members.

Notes

References 

Caves of Uzbekistan
Limestone caves
Surxondaryo Region